Yazır were a past tribe of Oghuz Turks. Today, the name refers to:

 Yazır, Acıpayam,Turkey
 Yazır, Ağlasun, Turkey
 Yazır, Boğazkale, Turkey
 Yazır, Çal, Turkey
 Yazır, Çavdır, Turkey
 Yazır, Çubuk,  a village in the district of Çubuk, Ankara Province, Turkey
 Yazır, Finike,  a village in the district of Finike, Antalya Province, Turkey
 Yazır, Karacasu, a village in the district of Karacasu, Aydın Province, Turkey
 Yazır, Korkuteli, a village in the district of Korkuteli, Antalya Province, Turkey
 Yazır, Kumluca, a village in the district of Kumluca, Antalya Province, Turkey